Gilson Trinidade de Jesus, also commonly known simply as Gilson de Jesus, or simply as Gilson (born 8 February 1956), is a Brazilian former professional basketball player.

Career
During his pro club career, de Jesus won four Brazilian Championships, in the seasons 1974, 1975, 1977, and 1981 II. With the senior men's Brazilian national basketball team, de Jesus competed at the 1978 FIBA World Cup, the 1980 Summer Olympics, and the 1982 FIBA World Cup.

References

External links
 

1956 births
Living people
Brazilian men's basketball players
1978 FIBA World Championship players
1982 FIBA World Championship players
Basketball players at the 1980 Summer Olympics
Franca Basquetebol Clube players
Olympic basketball players of Brazil
Sportspeople from Salvador, Bahia
Small forwards
Sociedade Esportiva Palmeiras basketball players